Cascades is an album by the American jazz pianist Marilyn Crispell, the British double bass player Barry Guy and the drummer Gerry Hemingway, which was recorded live in 1993 during the Vancouver Jazz Festival and released on the Music & Arts label. This was the first time that they worked together as a trio.

Reception

In his review for AllMusic, Scott Yanow wrote, "Although there is a creative use of space, the lack of any real themes or lyrical moments makes this performance much less interesting than one would expect considering the musicians involved."

The Penguin Guide to Jazz notes about the trio that "the combination is sometimes too cluttered, though the bassist also understands better than the two Americans how to leave light and shade, space and air, in this music".

Track listing
All titles are collective works
 "Ricochet" – 15:40
 "Violet Sparks in Soft Air" – 6:40
 "Resonances" – 5:19
 "Cascades" – 28:48
 "Shadow Play" – 3:13

Personnel
Marilyn Crispell – piano
Barry Guy - double bass
Gerry Hemingway - drums, vibraphone, gamelan

References

1995 live albums
Marilyn Crispell live albums
Music & Arts live albums